The 2015 Delhi Open was a professional tennis tournament played on outdoor hard courts. It is the second edition of the tournament for the men and for the women. It was part of the 2015 ATP Challenger Tour and the 2015 ITF Women's Circuit, offering a total of $100,000 in prize money in the men's event and $25,000 in the women's event. It took place in New Delhi, India, on 16–22 February 2015.

Singles main draw entrants

Seeds 

 1 Rankings as of 9 February 2015

Other entrants 
The following players received wildcards into the singles main draw:
  Yuki Bhambri
  Karunuday Singh
  Sanam Singh
  Vishnu Vardhan

The following players received entry from the qualifying draw:
  Vijay Sundar Prashanth
  Dino Marcan
  Sriram Balaji
  Richard Becker

The following players received entry into the main draw as a lucky loser:
  Andrew Whittington

Champions

Men's singles 

  Somdev Devvarman def.  Yuki Bhambri, 3–6, 6–4, 6–0

Women's singles 

  Magda Linette def.  Tadeja Majerič, 6–1, 6–1

Men's doubles 

  Egor Gerasimov /  Alexander Kudryavtsev def.  Riccardo Ghedin /  Toshihide Matsui, 6–7(5–7), 6–4, [10–6]

Women's doubles 

  Tang Haochen /  Yang Zhaoxuan def.   Hsu Ching-wen /  Lee Pei-chi, 7–5, 6–1

External links 
Official Website

Delhi Open
2015 ITF Women's Circuit
Sports competitions in Delhi
2015 in Indian tennis
Sports